James Coolidge Carter (October 14, 1827 – February 14, 1905) was a New York City lawyer, a partner in the firm that eventually became Carter Ledyard & Milburn, which he helped found in 1854.

Early life
Carter was born on October 14, 1827 in Lancaster, Massachusetts. He was the youngest of eight children born to Maj. Solomon Carter.

He prepared for college at Derby Academy in Hingham. He graduated from Harvard College in 1850 and Harvard Law School in 1853. While at Harvard, he was a member of the Institute of 1777 the Hasty Pudding Club, Alpha Delta Phi, and the Phi Beta Kappa Society.

Career

Carter entered the law office of Edward Kent, son of Chancellor James Kent, in New York, and in 1853 was admitted to the bar, starting a prominent law practice which later became known as Carter Ledyard & Milburn.

He was one of the founders and the first president of the National Civic League. In 1875, Governor Samuel J. Tilden appointed him a member of the commission to devise a form of municipal administration for cities in the state of New York, and in 1888, Governor David B. Hill appointed him a member of the Constitutional Commission. In 1892, he was appointed by President Benjamin Harrison as counsel, with Edward J. Phelps and Judge Henry Williams Blodgett, to present the claims of the United States before the Bering Sea tribunal.

Political Mugwump
Carter was an influential legal theorist among fellow Mugwumps. He deeply distrusted politicians and most elected officials. Instead he put his trust in disinterested experts, especially judges. He equated common law with custom, and his condemnation of legislation inconsistent with custom, reflected his Mugwumpism. He tried to synthesize traditional thinking with modernity.  For example, Carter clung to support for active government intervention he learned from the antebellum Whigs, but he more and more embrace antigovernment positions typical of antebellum Jacksonians. He tried to synthesize traditional faith in timeless, objective moral principles with a more modern vision of evolving customary norms. Given growing problems of industrial urban society he saw the need for positive government but wanted judges to rule not politicians.

Personal life
After an illness of a few days, he died at 7 East 88th Street (a Beaux-Arts townhouse built in 1903 by architects James R. Turner and William G. Killian), his residence in New York City on February 14, 1905. In New York, his funeral was held at All Souls' Church on Fourth Avenue and 22nd Street. Another funeral was conducted by the Rev. Prof. Francis Greenwood Peabody of Harvard and was held at the Mount Auburn Chapel at Cambridge where he was buried.

Legacy
In 1897, he donated $5,000 towards the construction of the Randolph Tucker Memorial Hall at Washington and Lee University, estimated at that time to cost $50,000.

References

Further reading

 Grossman, Lewis A. "James Coolidge Carter and Mugwump Jurisprudence." Law and History Review 20.3 (2002): 577-629. online

1827 births
1905 deaths
Fellows of the American Academy of Arts and Sciences
Lawyers from New York City
Harvard Law School alumni
People from Lancaster, Massachusetts